Sayed Kamsar-o-Bar Muslim Degree College (S.K.B.M Degree College) is a degree college in Dildarnagar, Ghazipur, Uttar Pradesh, India. It is one of the oldest colleges of Ghazipur District established in 1936 as Muslim Rajput High School. In 1949 it became a Muslim Rajput Inter College and was renamed in 1969 to Sayed Kamsar-o-Bar Muslim Inter College. In 1973, it became a degree college. The campus of Degree College was separated in 2003 when a new building for Degree College was made. 

The college has a capacity for over 5000 students. It is beside Jamia Arabia makhzunul uloom dildarnagar on road no. 1.

History
The school was founded by Sir Deputy Mohammad Sayed Khan who was the son of Subedar Alam Shah Khan and was born in a zamindar family of Usia. Sir Deputy Mohammad syed khan is also known as (sir Syed Ahmed ) of ghazipur.Because ,they also have same motto as a sir Syed Ahmed Khan who want to educate muslim community and want to reform muslim community .sir Deputy syed Ahmed Khan After completing his B.A. (Hons) in 1914 from Presidency College with first division, he joined Patna College as a lecturer. Jaiprakash Narayan was his student. Sir Deputy Muhammad Sayed Khan was served as a deputy of Hazaribagh where he Also helped Gandhi Ji to get bail. He was also a friend of Gandhi.  Sir Deputy Muhammad Sayed Khan had 25 acres of land near the town of Dildarnagar of which he established the school. In 1938 first class of school was conducted. It was the first English-medium privately owned school in Ghazipur which was not run by British government. In 1949, Rajput High school became Muslim Rajput Inter college. Rajput Inter College was renamed again in 1969 to Syed Kamsar-O-Bar Muslim Inter College After the deth of Sayed Khan in 1966. When Dr. Mahmud Khan was the manager of the school The school decided to established Degree College in Jun, 1973 so, it was established in year Dec, 1973 and affiliation was done on 25 jan, 1975. The classes of Degree College was conducted in the External campus   established in 1940 which was 1-2 km far from the main campus. Later, in 2003 a new building was made in the main campus and Degree College shifted to the new building. The school also wanted to establish a technical institute in year 1964 but still it is not made.

Courses

The SKBM Degree College offers three Bachelor Degree courses:
Bachelor of Arts
Bachelor of Commerce
Bachelor of Education
Master of Arts  
Certificate course also
National cadet core
Nss

Principals list
 Dr. Shyam Narayan Chaturvedi (1938-1940)
 Moniuddin Haidar Khan (1940-1970) 
 Satyanarayan Sharma (1970-1972)
 Dr. Jalaluddin Khan (1973-1988)
 Inyatullah Khan (1988-1995)
 Hashatullah Siddiqi (1996-1997)
 Jokhu Khan (1998-2014)
 Dr. Hasan Raza Khan (2015-2017)
 Dr. Furquan Ahmad Khan (2018-)

See also
Dildarnagar
Dildarnagar Kamsar
Usia
Purvanchal University

References

External links
Official website

Islamic universities and colleges in India
Universities and colleges in Uttar Pradesh
Education in Ghazipur district
Dildarnagar
Educational institutions established in 1936
1936 establishments in India